The Capinan (also called Capina) were a small tribe of Native American people from Alabama and Mississippi. They lived along the Gulf Coast region along the Pascagoula River. They are believed to have been a sub-tribe of the Pascagoula and Biloxi tribes. They might have been the same tribe as the Moctobi. Pierre Le Moyne d'Iberville visited the tribe in 1699 and Jean-Baptiste Le Moyne, Sieur de Bienville in 1725. They met many French people, and probably spoke both Siouan and French.

References

Native American tribes in Alabama
Native American tribes in Mississippi